Thaai Manasu is a 1994 Tamil-language drama film directed by Kasthuri Raja. The film stars Saravanan, Suvarna Mathew, Babloo Prithiveeraj and Meera, with Vijayakumar, Manorama, Goundamani, Senthil and Karikalan playing supporting roles. It was released on 2 December 1994.

Plot

The film begins with Chinna Marudhu giving milk to end the sufferings of his mother Muthamma.

In the past, Thangapandi was the village chief and was a follower of Mahatma Gandhi and he was married to Muthamma. They had two sons : Periya Marudhu and Chinna Marudhu. Chinna Marudhu and Annalakshmi were in love since their childhood while Periya Marudhu fell in love with Rasathi. The two young couples finally got married with their parents' blessings.

Thangapandi's village was the only village where the citizens didn't vote for the elections; only because Thangapandi hated the politicians and lost faith in politics. Being an important and populated village in the district, the politicians tried to convince Thangapandi but they failed each time so they charged the heartless liquor smuggler Kangeyan to brainwash the villagers' mind. First, Kangeyan sent his henchmen to kill Thangapandi but Chinna Marudhu and Periya Marudhu saved him in time. Then, Kangeyan brainwashed the weak brother Periya Marudhu and turned him against his family. What transpires later forms the crux of the story.

Cast

Saravanan as Chinna Marudhu
Suvarna Mathew as Annalakshmi
Babloo Prithiveeraj as Periya Marudhu
Meera as Rasathi
Vijayakumar as Thangapandi
Manorama as Muthamma
Goundamani as Chokkalingam
Senthil as Sakkarai
Karikalan as Kangeyan
Ganthimathi
Kumarimuthu
Delhi Ganesh
Idichapuli Selvaraj
Theni Kunjarammal
T.K.S. Chandran
Theni Saravanan
Chakravarthy
Sathyan
Anuja
Jayapriya
Mumtaz
Amutha
Chithra
Sevvazhairaj as Sevvazhai

Soundtrack

The music was composed by Deva, with lyrics written by Kasthuri Raja.

Reception
Malini Mannath of The Indian Express described the film as "unhappy Paradox".

References

External links

 

1994 films
1990s Tamil-language films
Indian action drama films
Films scored by Deva (composer)
Films directed by Kasthuri Raja
1990s action drama films